Knick Knack is an English equivalent of bric-à-brac.

Knick Knack, Knickknack or Nick Nack may also refer to:

 Knick Knack, a computer-animated Pixar short film
 This Old Man, a nursery rhyme that repeats the line "Knickknack Paddywhack" in each verse
 Knickknack, a member of Captain America-villains Death-Throws
 Knickknack Toys, from Some Assembly Required
 Nick Nack, The Man with the Golden Gun movie henchman to Bond villain Francisco Scaramanga
 "Nick Nack", a 2006 song from the Purple City album The Purple Album
 Knick knack, another name for ding dong ditch

See also

 Nikki Nack, 2014 album by Tune-Yards
Knack (disambiguation)
Knick (disambiguation)
Nick (disambiguation)
Nack (disambiguation)